Austen-Leigh is an English surname. Notable people with the surname include:

 Arthur Austen-Leigh
 Spencer Austen-Leigh (1834–1913), English cricketer
 Augustus Austen Leigh

See also
 Austen (given name)
 Austen (surname)
 Leigh (name)

English-language surnames
Compound surnames